Dane Beesley (born 1978) is an Australian photographer.
He has created photography books; exhibited widely; and his photographs are held in public and private collections.
Using the family basement as a darkroom, he began taking pictures from an early age but when he purchased an enormous jumble of old cameras and photography equipment from a deceased estate, he started experimenting.

Dane's work 
Dane Beesley has been described as a "leading Australian music photographer" by Melbourne street press Beat Magazine.
Marei Bischarn, photo editor at Rolling Stone Australia, described his work as "honesty in photos; nothing planned or fabricated – just pure energy and great times. It’s like having a drink while you’re getting ready to go out." Continuing to say of his book Splitting the Seconds: A Photographer's Journal "Flick through this book, grab your jacket and run out that door ‘cos something magical has to happen." 
Splitting the Seconds: A Photographer's Journal is Dane Beesley's account of ten years behind the camera, behind the scenes of Australian rock n roll. With cheeky and endearing cartoon sketches and hasty diary scribbles, take a peek at the sweaty, boozy life of the rock n roll photographer as he moves from gig to portrait to band shoot, from Nick Cave to Evan Dando to The Dandy Warhols. Dirty and beautiful, Splitting the Seconds bottles a decade in Australian rock.  Splitting the Seconds was launched in Brisbane at Metro Arts Gallery with an exhibition of his Brisbane music photos. 

Dane's second book "The Road" showcases his photos like soft punctuation marks – an exclamation that is quiet and yet not without a tension. There's the closeness, the fact of a steering wheel, or the cosy interior of a car eerily framing a misty countryside.

In SHADES, morning seems to originate in the stillness of a parked car. A leaning smoking woman in a striped shirt has less a shadow more a shadow self – it's all in the texture of shades. Models clamber on a sand dune (or do they channel it?). A suited-up cowboy-man alights a shopping centre escalator while inky-dark ferns track him.

Books 
Splitting the Seconds: A Photographer's Journal (released 2011) 
The Road (released 2012) 
Shades (released 2016) 
Yelseeb Enad (released 2017)

References

External links 
Official Website 

Australian photographers
People from Brisbane
Living people
1978 births
Rock music photographers